Herbert Rooke Oldfield (1859 – 22 December 1940) was a British solicitor and philatelist who signed the Roll of Distinguished Philatelists in 1922.

Oldfield was president of the International Philatelic Union and honorary secretary, 1895, of the Society for the Suppression of Speculative Issues. He collected India, Bolivia, Bosnia, Chinese locals and Formosa, Colombia, Persia, and Swiss Cantonals.

References

Signatories to the Roll of Distinguished Philatelists
1859 births
1940 deaths
British philatelists
British solicitors
Fellows of the Royal Philatelic Society London